The 1983–84 NBA season was the 38th season of the National Basketball Association. The season ended with the Boston Celtics winning the NBA Championship, beating the Los Angeles Lakers 4 games to 3 for the second time since 1969 in the NBA Finals.

Notable occurrences

The 1984 NBA All-Star Game was played at McNichols Sports Arena in Denver, Colorado, with the East defeating the West 154–145. Isiah Thomas of the Detroit Pistons wins the game's MVP award. Larry Nance of the Phoenix Suns won the first NBA Slam Dunk Championship.
David Stern begins his tenure as the league's fourth commissioner, effective April 1.
The NBA Playoffs were expanded from 6 teams per conference to 8, where it stands to this date (with a play-in tournament for the #7 and #8 seeds in each conference added in 2020). As a result, the 'first round bye' system was eliminated.
Marked the first year the first round of the NBA Playoffs went from best-of-three to best-of-five playoff. The first round remained best-of-five until going to best-of-seven in 2003.
Ralph Sampson became the first rookie to win the Rookie of the Month Award in every month of the season. He unanimously won the Rookie of the Year Award. David Robinson, Tim Duncan, LeBron James, Chris Paul, Blake Griffin, Damian Lillard, and Karl-Anthony Towns would later achieve the same feat.
Kareem Abdul-Jabbar surpassed Wilt Chamberlain to become the all-time NBA career leader in points. He passed Chamberlain in a game against the Utah Jazz at Las Vegas' Thomas & Mack Center on April 5. Fittingly, it was his trademark sky-hook that put him in the record books.
 The Denver Nuggets and Detroit Pistons play in the highest scoring game in NBA history with the Pistons winning 186–184 in three overtimes.
 The Dallas Mavericks made its first postseason appearance, beating the Seattle SuperSonics 3–2 before bowing out to the Los Angeles Lakers 4–1 in the Conference Semifinals. Game 5 of the Seattle series was played at Moody Coliseum as Reunion Arena, the Mavericks' home, was unavailable.
The Utah Jazz appeared in the postseason for the first time, defeating the Denver Nuggets 3–2 in the opening round and then losing to the Phoenix Suns 4–2 in the Western semis. This started a streak of 20 consecutive playoff appearances, fourth longest in the NBA behind the Portland Trail Blazers (21 between 1983 and 2003), the Philadelphia 76ers (23 between 1949 (as Syracuse Nationals) and 1971), and the San Antonio Spurs current streak of 22 starting in 1998).
The Clippers play their final season in San Diego, California.
This would be the last season until 2013–14 that the Finals had the 2–2–1–1–1 format. The Finals would adopt the 2–3–2 format the following season.
The New Jersey Nets won a playoff series for the first time in their NBA history, upsetting the defending champion Philadelphia 76ers in five games. The series marked the only time (to date) a road team won every game in a five-game playoff series.
Final season of ESPN broadcasting NBA games until the 2002–03 season, which also marked the league's return to future corporate partner ABC. It also marked the final season of NBA broadcasts on the USA Network.
Spalding replaced Wilson as manufacturer of the official NBA game ball, a relationship that continued until 2021.
It was the final season for eventual Hall of Famers Tiny Archibald, Elvin Hayes and Bob Lanier.
All five teams in the Atlantic Division made the Playoffs, the first such occurrence for any division.

Final standings

By division

By conference

Notes
z – Clinched home court advantage for the entire playoffs
c – Clinched home court advantage for the conference playoffs
y – Clinched division title 
x – Clinched playoff spot

Playoffs
Teams in bold advanced to the next round. The numbers to the left of each team indicate the team's seeding in its conference, and the numbers to the right indicate the number of games the team won in that round. The division champions are marked by an asterisk. Home court advantage does not necessarily belong to the higher-seeded team, but instead the team with the better regular season record; teams enjoying the home advantage are shown in italics.

Statistics leaders

NBA awards

Yearly awards
Most Valuable Player: Larry Bird, Boston Celtics
Rookie of the Year: Ralph Sampson, Houston Rockets
 Defensive Player of the Year: Sidney Moncrief, Milwaukee Bucks
Sixth Man of the Year: Kevin McHale, Boston Celtics
Coach of the Year: Frank Layden, Utah Jazz

All-NBA First Team:
F – Larry Bird, Boston Celtics
F – Bernard King, New York Knicks
C – Kareem Abdul-Jabbar, Los Angeles Lakers
G – Isiah Thomas, Detroit Pistons
G – Magic Johnson, Los Angeles Lakers

All-NBA Second Team:
F – Adrian Dantley, Utah Jazz
F – Julius Erving, Philadelphia 76ers
C – Moses Malone, Philadelphia 76ers
G – Sidney Moncrief, Milwaukee Bucks
G – Jim Paxson, Portland Trail Blazers

All-NBA Rookie Team:
Steve Stipanovich, Indiana Pacers
Ralph Sampson, Houston Rockets
Darrell Walker, New York Knicks
Jeff Malone, Washington Bullets
Thurl Bailey, Utah Jazz
Byron Scott, Los Angeles Lakers

NBA All-Defensive First Team:
Bobby Jones, Philadelphia 76ers
Michael Cooper, Los Angeles Lakers
Tree Rollins, Atlanta Hawks
Maurice Cheeks, Philadelphia 76ers
Sidney Moncrief, Milwaukee Bucks

NBA All-Defensive Second Team:
Larry Bird, Boston Celtics
Dan Roundfield, Atlanta Hawks
Kareem Abdul-Jabbar, Los Angeles Lakers
Dennis Johnson, Boston Celtics
T.R. Dunn, Denver Nuggets

Player of the week
The following players were named NBA Player of the Week.

Player of the month
The following players were named NBA Player of the Month.

Rookie of the month
The following players were named NBA Rookie of the Month.

Coach of the month
The following coaches were named NBA Coach of the Month.

References